Cucullia omissa, known generally as the omitted cucullia or Alberta falconer, is a species of moth in the family Noctuidae (the owlet moths). It is found in North America.

The MONA or Hodges number for Cucullia omissa is 10199.

References

Further reading

 
 
 

Cucullia
Articles created by Qbugbot
Moths described in 1916